Grimsbury Reservoir is a relatively small reservoir owned by Thames Water just off Hennef Way, near the Grimsbury estate of Banbury, Oxfordshire.

A waterworks was built prior to 1947  and was expanded in the early 1960s, when Grimsbury Reservoir was built.

The reservoir is surrounded by a nature reserve and is fed by the River Cherwell, the water itself includes many species of wildlife and the site includes parking facilities and other amenities. It is often used for water sports such as Sailing and kayaking clubs as well as angling.

It has the coordinates . The average depth is 8 ft (2.4 m).

External links

 A Map of the reservoir.

Reservoirs in Oxfordshire
Thames Water reservoirs